The 1920 United States presidential election in Indiana took place on November 2, 1920, as part of the 1920 United States presidential election which was held throughout all contemporary 48 states. Voters chose 15 representatives, or electors to the Electoral College, who voted for president and vice president. 

Indiana voted for the Republican nominee, Ohio Senator Warren G. Harding, over the Democratic nominee, Ohio Governor James M. Cox. Harding ran with Massachusetts Governor Calvin Coolidge, while Cox ran with Assistant Secretary of the Navy Franklin D. Roosevelt of New York. 

Harding won the state by a margin of 14.65%.

Results

Results by county

See also
 United States presidential elections in Indiana

References

Indiana
1920
1920 Indiana elections